Adriano Darioli (born 14 January 1956) is an Italian former biathlete. He competed at the 1980 Winter Olympics and the 1984 Winter Olympics.

References

External links
 

1956 births
Living people
Italian male biathletes
Olympic biathletes of Italy
Biathletes at the 1980 Winter Olympics
Biathletes at the 1984 Winter Olympics
Sportspeople from the Province of Verbano-Cusio-Ossola